Malat (also Romanized as Malāţ) is a village in Daryasar Rural District, Kumeleh District, Langarud County, Gilan Province, Iran. At the 2006 census, its population was 1,034, in 326 families.

References 

Populated places in Langarud County